Thelymitra reflexa, commonly called the reflexed sun orchid, is a species of orchid that is endemic to Victoria. It has a single erect, fleshy, channelled leaf and up to six bluish purple flowers. The sepals and petals are strongly turned back towards the ovary but only on hot days when the flowers open.

Description
The lobe on the top of the anther is dark blackish green, gently curved and deeply notched. The side lobes curve upwards and have mop-like tufts of white, sometimes pink hairs. Flowering occurs in October and November but the flowers are self-pollinating and only open widely on hot days.

Taxonomy and naming
Thelymitra reflexa was first formally described in 2005 by Jeff Jeanes and the description was published in Muelleria from a specimen collected near Crib Point. The specific epithet (reflexa) is a Latin word meaning "bent or turned back" referring to the strongly reflexed sepals and petals, although the flower only open on very hot days.

Distribution and habitat
The reflexed sun orchid grows in heathy woodland but is only known from the Mornington Peninsula and French Island.

References

External links
 

reflexa
Endemic orchids of Australia
Orchids of Victoria (Australia)
Plants described in 2005